Martins Pond is a lake in Middlesex County, in the U.S. state of Massachusetts.

Martins Pond was named after William Martin, a pioneer citizen. A variant name is "Martin Pond".

References

Lakes of Middlesex County, Massachusetts